The 1998 Division One Championship season was the second tier of British rugby league during the 1998 season. The competition featured eleven teams, with Wakefield Trinity winning the league and the inaugural Grand Final.

Championship
The league was won by Wakefield Trinity. Wakefield also won the inaugural First Division Grand Final against Featherstone Rovers, and were awarded a place in the Super League. Despite being on the losing side, Richard Chapman won the Tom Bergin Trophy.

No teams were relegated, as the First and Second Divisions were merged to form a single division which would later become known as the Northern Ford Premiership.

League table

Play-offs

Week 1
Featherstone Rovers 22–12 Swinton Lions

Hull Kingston Rovers 18–2 Dewsbury Rams

Week 2
Wakefield Trinity 19–16 Hull Kingston Rovers

Dewsbury Rams 10–20 Featherstone Rovers

Week 3
Hull Kingston Rovers 6–54 Featherstone Rovers

Grand Final

See also
1998 Challenge Cup

References

External links

1998 season at wigan.rlfans.com

Rugby Football League Championship
RFL Division One